Sierpe is a district of the Osa canton, in the Puntarenas province of Costa Rica.

Geography 
Sierpe has an area of  km² and an elevation of  metres.

Demographics 

For the 2011 census, Sierpe had a population of  inhabitants.

Transportation

Road transportation 
The district is covered by the following road routes:
 National Route 223
 National Route 245

References 

Districts of Puntarenas Province
Populated places in Puntarenas Province